Patrick O'Bryan (born February 17, 1960) is an American actor known for his appearances in a variety of television shows and films in the late 1980s and early 1990s. He is perhaps best known for his starring role as "Spike" in the 1988 cult film 976-EVIL, which also marked the directorial debut of A Nightmare on Elm Street star Robert Englund.

Career 
Patrick O'Bryan's first television role came in 1986, where he portrayed Phillip in the television series Heart of the City. O'Bryan continued television acting throughout the next few years making appearances on television shows such as "You are the Jury" and the popular "Highway to Heaven," among others. In 1988, O'Bryan received his first starring role alongside Stephen Geoffreys in the film 976-EVIL, directed by Robert Englund, who is most well known for his role as Freddy Kruger. Despite being panned by critics, the film has maintained a cult following amongst enthusiasts.

O'Bryan would continue to appear in both television and film before returning to reprise his role in the sequel to 976-EVIL, which would be his last known film.

Works

Film

Television

References

External links 

 Patrick O'Bryan at IMDb

American male television actors
 1960 births
Male actors from Illinois
American male film actors
Actors from Oak Park, Illinois
People from Oak Park, Illinois
20th-century American male actors
Living people